Don Antonio station is an under-construction Manila Metro Rail Transit (MRT) station situated on Line 7 located along Commonwealth Avenue in Holy Spirit, Quezon City. Landmarks near the station include the Ever Gotesco Commonwealth shopping mall and Shopwise Commonwealth. Its working title was Station 5.

, the project is 66.07% complete; the station's construction is to be finished by June of the same year.

References

External links
Proposed Don Antonio MRT Station

Manila Metro Rail Transit System stations
Railway stations under construction in the Philippines